Zoo Atlanta (sometimes referred as Atlanta Zoo) is an Association of Zoos and Aquariums (AZA) accredited zoological park in Atlanta, Georgia. The current president and CEO of Zoo Atlanta is Raymond B. King.

History

Zoo Atlanta was founded in 1889, when businessman George V. Gress purchased a bankrupt traveling circus and donated the animals to the city of Atlanta. City leaders opted to house the collection in Grant Park, which remains the zoo's present location. Original residents of the zoo included a black bear, a raccoon, a jaguar, a hyena, a gazelle, a Mexican hog, lionesses, monkeys, and camels. The zoo's collection expanded in the 1930s with the personal donation of a private menagerie owned by Asa G. Candler, Jr.

The 1950s and 1960s were decades of renovation and construction at the zoo, but by the early 1970s, many of its exhibits and facilities were outdated and showing signs of disrepair. In 1970, a small group of concerned citizens founded the Atlanta Zoological Society in hopes of raising funds and awareness for the institution.

Following a period of decline in the mid-1980s, the zoo was privatized in 1985 with the creation of a nonprofit organization, Atlanta Fulton-County Zoo Inc., and was renamed Zoo Atlanta that same year. A 20-year period of aggressive restoration followed, marked by several high-profile exhibit openings, including The Ford African Rain Forest, in the late 1980s and early 1990s. A pair of giant pandas, Lun Lun and Yang Yang, arrived at Zoo Atlanta in 1999 and made their debut at Zoo Atlanta in 1999.

Habitats

African Savanna

Zoo Atlanta's African Savanna, opened in 2019 as part of the Zoo's Grand New View transformation, houses wildlife native to the grasslands and desert of Africa, including African elephants, lions, giraffes, plains zebras, ostriches, warthogs, meerkats, white rhinos, kori bustards and a bontebok.

Scaly Slimy Spectacular: The Amphibian and Reptile Experience
Opened in 2015, Scaly Slimy Spectacular: The Amphibian and Reptile Experience was the world's first LEED Gold-certified amphibian and reptile complex. The complex, which replaced the Zoo's former World of Reptiles, is home to more than 200 animals representing more than 70 species. Notable reproductive successes include Arakan forest turtles, a critically endangered species harvested nearly to extinction for food and traditional medicine. A rare Guatemalan beaded lizard hatched at Zoo Atlanta in March 2012. A critically endangered bog turtle hatched at Zoo Atlanta in 2022 for the first time in 30 years.

Reptiles
Alligator snapping turtle
Amazon tree boa
Banded rock rattlesnake
Black beaded lizard
Blood python
Boa constrictor
Boelen's python
Burmese star tortoise
Centralian rough knob-tailed gecko
Corn snake
Diamondback terrapin
Eastern diamondback rattlesnake
Eastern indigo snake
Eastern Pilbara spiny-tailed skink
Emerald tree monitor
Eyelash viper
Fiji banded iguana
Gaboon viper
Green anaconda
Green tree python
Guatemalan beaded lizard
Jamaican boa
Jamaican iguana
Louisiana pinesnake
McCord's box turtle
Mexican box turtle
Mexican cantil
Neotropical bird snake
Northern caiman lizard
Pancake tortoise
Papuan python
Pine snake
Plumed basilisk
Prehensile-tailed skink
Red spitting cobra
Reticulated python
Spexkled rattlesnake
Sri Lankan green pitviper
Timber rattlesnake
Timor python
West African slender-snouted crocodile
Yellow-blotched map turtle

Amphibians
Black-legged poison frog
Dyeing poison dart frog
Evergreen toad
Green and black poison dart frog
Lemur leaf frog
Panamanian golden frog
Red-eyed tree frog
Strawberry poison-dart frog
Titicaca water frog
White-spotted glass frog

Arthur M. Blank Family Foundation Giant Panda Conservation Center

Zoo Atlanta is one of three institutions in the U.S. currently housing giant pandas. Lun Lun (female) and Yang Yang (male) arrived in Atlanta as juveniles in 1999 and reside at the zoo on loan from China. The pair's first cub, male Mei Lan, was born on September 6, 2006. A second cub, male Xi Lan, was born August 30, 2008. Female Po was born November 3, 2010. Po's name was announced by actor Jack Black in 2011; Po was named after Black's character in the DreamWorks films Kung Fu Panda. A fourth and a fifth cub, both female, born July 15, 2013, were the first twin pandas to be born in the U.S. since 1987. Their names were announced on ABC's Good Morning America on October 23, 2013; 100 days after their birth, which is a Chinese tradition. The names are Mei Lun and Mei Huan. As of October 2015, Mei Lan, Xi Lan, Po, Mei Lun, and Mei Huan reside at the Chengdu Research Base of Giant Panda Breeding in China.

A sixth and seventh cub, both female, were born September 3, 2016. Their names were announced on their 100th day of life: Ya Lun and Xi Lun. Like their older siblings, the twins will ultimately travel to China.

The giant pandas reside in the Zoo's Arthur M. Blank Family Foundation Giant Panda Conservation Center.

The Ford African Rain Forest

Twenty-four western lowland gorillas have been born at the zoo since the opening of The Ford African Rain Forest in 1988. Kali and Kazi, a rare set of twins, were born at Zoo Atlanta on October 31, 2005.

Zoo Atlanta also remains home to offspring of its best-known gorilla, Willie B. (ca. 1959–2000). The zoo is also home to six of Willie B.'s grandchildren: Merry Leigh (2011) and Mijadala (2016), born to Kudzoo; Anaka (2013), born to Sukari; Andi (2013) and Floyd (2019), born to Lulu. Others reside at other accredited zoos.

Other famous gorillas who have lived at Zoo Atlanta include Ivan, who resided at the Zoo from 1994 to his passing in 2012, and Ozzie, who lived at the Zoo from 1988 until his passing in 2022.

The Living Treehouse is an extension of The Ford African Rain Forest completed in 2004. The exhibit houses an aviary of African birds, as well as black-and-white ruffed lemurs and ring-tailed lemurs, with adjacent habitats for Angolan colobus monkeys, drills, Schmidt's guenons, and Wolf's guenons. In 2017, Zoo Atlanta introduced two crowned lemurs.

Corridor to Change and Complex Carnivores
Corridor to Change is focused on species impacted by the international wildlife trade. The complex is home to sun bears and Sumatran tigers. An adjacent area, Complex Carnivores, houses clouded leopards and binturongs.

Asian Forest
The Asian Forest houses giant otters, a Komodo dragon and a red panda, as well as Bornean and Sumatran orangutans.

The Orangutan Learning Tree Project, launched at Zoo Atlanta in 2007, utilizes in-habitat touch screen technology to allow orangutans to engage in computer puzzles, games and problem-solving exercises while guests observe their activities on a linked monitor.

Orkin Children's Zoo
Zoo Atlanta's Outback Station petting zoo is home to Saanen goats, Oberhasli goats, Nubian goats, Southdown babydoll sheep, Gulf Coast sheep, Nigerian dwarf goats, and two kunekune pigs.

Aviaries
Aviaries throughout Zoo Atlanta are home to more than 50 species. These include but are not limited to Bali mynas, white-headed buffalo weavers, superb starling, golden pheasant, king vulture, hooded vulture, Indian peafowl, blue-throated macaw, milky eagle owl, southern ground hornbill, tawny frogmouth, blue-throated laughingthrush, blue crane, wattled crane, and white storks.

Zoo Atlanta's flock of Chilean flamingos, visible just inside the Zoo entrance in Flamingo Plaza, has consistently bred and nested since 2001.

Conservation and Research
Zoo Atlanta's mission statement is "We save wildlife and their habitats through conservation, research, education, and engaging experiences. Our efforts connect people to animals and inspire conservation action."

Species impacted by conservation support from Zoo Atlanta have included but are not limited to giant pandas, African elephants, golden lion tamarins, western lowland gorillas, Panamanian golden frogs, red pandas, clouded leopards, giant otters, Bornean orangutans, African vulture species such as hooded vultures and lappet-faced vultures, and native reptile species such as eastern indigo snakes and diamondback terrapins.

In 2018, Zoo Atlanta was named a Top 10 Research Zoo for its contributions to peer-reviewed scientific research.

Species Survival Plans
Zoo Atlanta is a participant in the AZA Species Survival Plan for the following programs:

 Aruba Island rattlesnake
 Bali mynah
 Black rhino
 Bongo
 Burmese star tortoise
 Clouded leopard
 African elephant
 Giant panda
 Gorilla
 Golden lion tamarin
 Guenon
 Komodo dragon
 Kori bustard
 Lemur
 Lion
 Orangutan
 Otter
 Radiated tortoise
 Red panda
 Sumatran tiger

Zoo Atlanta also participates in several international conservation initiatives for reptiles and amphibians, working to combat issues such as the Asian Turtle Crisis and Global Amphibian Decline. Staff members from Zoo Atlanta and the Atlanta Botanical Garden have established captive assurance colonies of Panamanian frogs threatened by the spread of chytrid fungus. (Chytrid is the cause of the infectious amphibian disease chytridiomycosis.)

Savanna Hall
Built in 1921, the historic Savanna Hall was for decades the former home of the Atlanta Cyclorama painting "The Battle of Atlanta." The painting now resides at the Atlanta History Center.

Zoo Atlanta was granted stewardship of the structure by Atlanta mayor Kasim Reed in 2014. Upon restoring the building, Zoo Atlanta engaged in many efforts to retain nods to the structure's history, including but not limited to preserving its original granite facade, original terra cotta walls, and original rail system used to hang the massive painting. These are visible in what is now the Michael and Thalia Carlos Ballroom.

Savanna Hall opened as a special events destination in 2019.

Leadership
Atlanta native Raymond B. King has served as president and CEO since 2010. Zoo Atlanta has a Board of Directors who are elected for three-year terms.

Dennis W. Kelly served as President and CEO from 2003 to 2009. Dr. Terry Maple is Zoo Director Emeritus of Zoo Atlanta. In 1985, he assumed management responsibility for zoo operations of the Atlanta-Fulton County Zoo, Inc, which was privatized and rebranded as Zoo Atlanta. Maple retired from Zoo Atlanta in 2003.

Duane Rumbaugh, a professor at Georgia State University in Atlanta, was a longtime advisor and researcher on animal behavior and welfare.

Gallery

References

Further reading
 Francis Desiderio, "Raising the Bars: The Transformation of Atlanta’s Zoo, 1889-2000." Atlanta History 18.4 (2000): 8-64.

External links

Zoo Atlanta on zooinstitutes.com

Zoos in Georgia (U.S. state)
Tourist attractions in Atlanta
1889 establishments in Georgia (U.S. state)